The Belgium women's national handball team is the national team of Belgium. It is governed by the Royal Belgian Handball Federation and takes part in international handball competitions. As of 2021, it never participated in major international tournaments.

Summer Olympics

External links
 Flemish Handball Federation of Belgium
 French-speaking Handball Federation of Belgium

Women's national handball teams
Women's national sports teams of Belgium
National team